A830 may refer to:

 A830, a point-and-shoot digital camera manufactured by General Imaging
 A830 road, Scotland

See also 

 A380 (disambiguation)